Geoffrey Michael Foster (born 5 April 1935) is a former West Indian cricketer. He played six first-class games for Barbados, including one appearance against Trinidad in the 1961–62 Pentangular Tournament. His best innings figures of 4/31 came on debut, against Jamaica at Kingston in 1958–59.

References

External links
 

1935 births
Barbados cricketers
Cricketers from Bridgetown
Living people
Barbadian cricketers